The Eastern Michigan Eagles football statistical leaders are individual statistical leaders of the Eastern Michigan Eagles football program in various categories, including passing, rushing, receiving, total offense, defensive stats, and kicking. Within those areas, the lists identify single-game, single-season, and career leaders. The Eagles represent Eastern Michigan University in the NCAA's Mid-American Conference.

Although Eastern Michigan began competing in intercollegiate football in 1891, the school's official record book considers the "modern era" to have begun in 1951. Records from before this year are often incomplete and inconsistent, and they are generally not included in these lists.

These lists are dominated by more recent players for several reasons:
 Since 1951, seasons have increased from 10 games to 11 and then 12 games in length.
 The NCAA didn't allow freshmen to play varsity football until 1972 (with the exception of the World War II years), allowing players to have four-year careers.
 However, the effect isn't as extreme for Eastern Michigan as it is in many other schools. While the NCAA only recognizes bowl game statistics as part of single-season and career statistics in 2002 and later, the Eagles never played in a bowl until the 2016 Bahamas Bowl, and have played in only three since then (the 2018 Camellia Bowl, 2019 Quick Lane Bowl, and 2021 LendingTree Bowl). Similarly, the Eagles are the only MAC school not to have played in the MAC Football Championship Game.
 Due to COVID-19 issues, the NCAA declared that the 2020 season would not count against the athletic eligibility of any football player, giving everyone active in that season the opportunity for five years of eligibility instead of the standard four. However, the effect of this NCAA ruling was muted for all MAC teams because that conference played only a 6-game schedule in 2020 instead of the normal 12 games.

These lists are updated through game 1 of the 2021 season.

Passing

Passing yards

Passing touchdowns

Rushing

Rushing yards

Rushing touchdowns

Receiving

Receptions

Receiving yards

Receiving touchdowns

Total offense
Total offense is the sum of passing and rushing statistics. It does not include receiving or returns.

Total offense yards

Touchdowns responsible for
"Touchdowns responsible for" is the NCAA's official term for combined passing and rushing touchdowns.

Defense

Interceptions

Tackles

Sacks

Kicking

Field goals made

References

Eastern Michigan